{{DISPLAYTITLE:C6H5Cl2N}}
The molecular formula C6H5Cl2N may refer to:

 Dichloroanilines
 2,3-Dichloroaniline
 2,4-Dichloroaniline
 2,5-Dichloroaniline
 2,6-Dichloroaniline
 3,4-Dichloroaniline
 3,5-Dichloroaniline